Peripatus danicus is a species of velvet worm in the Peripatidae family. Females of this species have 31 to 33 pairs of legs; males have 26 to 28. Females range from 26 mm to 45 mm in length, whereas males range from 9 mm to 21 mm. The type locality is in Saint Thomas Island.

References

Onychophorans of tropical America
Onychophoran species
Animals described in 1900